Isaac Arias (born 8 October 1990) is a Colombian professional footballer who plays as a forward for Deportes Tolima.

Honours 
Deportes Tolima
 Copa Colombia (1): 2014

External links 
 

1990 births
Living people
Colombian footballers
Categoría Primera A players
Categoría Primera B players
Deportes Tolima footballers
Association football forwards
People from Valledupar